Elections to East Lothian Council were held on 3 May 2012, on the same day as the other Scottish local government elections. The election used the 7 wards created as a result of the Local Governance (Scotland) Act 2004, with each ward electing three or four councillors using the single transferable vote system form of proportional representation, with 23 councillors elected.

The election saw Labour strengthen their position on the council, regaining 3 of the seats they had lost in the 2007 Local Elections while also significantly increasing their vote share. The Scottish National Party also increased their representation with 2 net gains. The Scottish Conservative and Unionist Party increased their representation to 3 seats while Independents retained their single seat on the authority. The Scottish Liberal Democrats were decimated, losing all their six seats although two members had defected after 2007 and one of these councillors was re-elected as a Scottish Nationalist, the other failed to be re-elected as a Scottish Nationalist.

Following the election the Labour Party formed a coalition with the Conservatives and the one Independent councillor, with Councillor Willie Innes of the Labour Party becoming leader of the council and experienced Conservative Councillor Ludovic Broun-Lindsay becoming provost, resigning as leader of the Conservatives on the council to hold the provost role in a non-partisan and non-party political way, with new councillor Michael Veitch becoming leader of the Conservative group. This new coalition replaced the previous SNP - Lib Dem coalition administration, which had existed from 2007 to 2012.

Background
The previous elections in 2007 had returned no one party with enough councillors to create majority single-party governance as there had been in East Lothian up until that point. The SNP and Labour both returned 7 councillors to the chamber, the Liberal Democrats won 6, the Conservatives 2 and a sole independent candidate was elected as councillor. After the election, the SNP and the Liberal Democrats entered into a coalition, throwing Labour out of office, having previously controlled the council with a large majority for many years before that.

The 2012 election was the first since Councillor David Berry had fallen only 151 votes short of winning East Lothian for the SNP in the 2011 Scottish Parliament Elections a major coup due to the seat being considered a traditional Labour stronghold seat and it being the seat of then leader of Scottish Labour, Iain Gray. While nationally at that election the SNP was the first party to gain an overall majority in the Scottish Parliament. With this result still fresh in the mind, the SNP predicted major gains, including taking overall majority control of many councils including East Lothian.

The Labour Party, in many aspects still reeling from national electoral annihilation on a national level during the previous year's election, had come into the election with the hope of gaining seats, with a slim hope gaining a majority control of the council.

The Liberal Democrats had struggled during the previous five years of leadership on the council with the SNP. They had suffered the defection of wife-and-husband councillor duo of Ruth and Stuart Currie on 11 August 2009 to their coalition partners, the SNP, due to "personal disagreements" with fellow Liberal Democrat councillors. This reduced their representation on the council from 6 to 4, weakening their hand in the rule coalition. It also had the effect of damaging the morale and effectiveness of the local party. This was also the Scottish Liberal Democrats' second election since the entering coalition with the Conservative Party in the UK Parliament. The party had suffered badly at the 2011 Scottish Parliament Election, and it was expected that this would continue in the 2012 local elections.

For the Scottish Conservatives, it was the first election since the election of Ruth Davidson as leader of the party in Scotland. On a local the Conservatives entered the election in East Lothian with a realistic hope of a gain in the election through Michael Veitch, who was the Conservative candidate in the 2010 general election in East Lothian, in the Dunbar and East Linton ward. Previously the Conservatives had come second in the 2010 General Election, a very good result. The party locally believed that it would be able to hold the balance of power in the new makeup of the council with the opinion of working with either the Labour Party or the SNP on a local level.

Independent John Caldwell had first been elected in 2007, and the local media felt that he would keep his seat during this election. There was little chance of this changing due to him being considered an effective local politician by the majority of the public. He was joined by 3 other independent candidates who were standing in other wards, none of whom, it was felt, who stood a realistic chance of being elected.

Two minor parties also took part in the election, UKIP and Trade Unionist and Socialist Coalition, each standing 2 and 1 candidates respectively. This was the first time that both of these parties were standing candidates in the East Lothian Council elections since the introduction of the current voting system.

Since the election in 2012 Councillor David Berry has left the SNP and now sits as an Independent Nationalist councillor.

In April 2013 Councillor Stuart Currie replaced Councillor Paul McLennan as SNP Group Leader and Leader of the Opposition.

Election result

Note: "Votes" are the first preference votes. The net gain/loss and percentage changes relate to the result of the previous Scottish local elections on 3 May 2007. This may differ from other published sources showing gain/loss relative to seats held at dissolution of Scotland's councils.

Ward results

Musselburgh West
2007: 1xSNP; 1xLab; 1xLib Dem
2012: 2xSNP; 1xLab
2007-2012 Change: SNP gain one seat from Lib Dem

Musselburgh East and Carberry
2007: 1xSNP; 1xLab; 1xIndependent
2012: 1xIndependent; 1xSNP; 1xLab
2007-2012 Change: No change

 = Outgoing Councillor from a different Ward.

Preston/Seton/Gosford
2007: 2xLab; 1xSNP; 1xLib Dem
2012: 2xLab; 2xSNP
2007-2012 Change: SNP gain one seat from Lib Dem

Fa'side
2007: 2xLab; 1xSNP; 1xLib Dem
2012: 3xLab; 1xSNP
2007-2012 Change: Lab gain one seat from Lib Dem

North Berwick Coastal
2007: 1xCon; 1xSNP; 1xLib Dem
2012: 1xCon; 1xLab; 1xSNP
2007-2012 Change: Lab gain one seat from Lib Dem

Haddington and Lammermuir
2007: 1xCon; 1xSNP; 1xLib Dem
2012: 1xLab; 1xSNP; 1xCon
2007-2012 Change: Lab gain one seat from Lib Dem

Dunbar and East Linton
2007: 1xSNP; 1xLib Dem; 1xLab
2012: 1xLab; 1xSNP; 1xCon
2007-2012 Change: Con gain one seat from Lib Dem

Post Election Changes
† On 6 March 2013 North Berwick Coastal SNP Cllr David Stuart Berry resigned from the party and became an Independent Nationalist after comparing the Union to slavery on Twitter.

References

https://web.archive.org/web/20120507032037/http://www.eastlothian.gov.uk/info/200210/council_elections_thursday_3_may_2012/1431/council_election_results__thursday_3_may

2012
2012 Scottish local elections